Attimo x attimo is the debut album from Italian singer Anna Tatangelo.

The title track, "Attimo x attimo", was originally written for Mia Martini, but because of her death, never got the chance to record it.

Track listing

Singles
 "Doppiamente fragili" (2002)
 "Un nuovo bacio" (2002)
 "Volere volare" (2003)
 "Corri" (2003)
 "Attimo x Attimo" (2003)
 "L'amore piu grande che c'è" (2004)

2003 albums
Anna Tatangelo albums